Kapat (sometimes spelled Kapaat) is a  boma in  Makuach payam, Bor Central County, Jonglei State, South Sudan, about 10 kilometers east of Bor.

Demographics
According to the Fifth Population and Housing Census of Sudan, conducted in April 2008, Kapat  boma had a population of 6,193 people, composed of 3,169 male and 3,024 female residents.

Notes

References 

Populated places in Jonglei State